David Paul Scofield  (21 January 1922 – 19 March 2008) was an English actor. During a six-decade career, Scofield achieved the Triple Crown of Acting, winning an Academy Award, Emmy, and Tony for his work. He won the three awards in a seven-year span, the fastest of any performer to accomplish the feat.

Scofield received Best Performance by a Leading Actor in a Play at the 1962 Tony Awards for portraying Sir Thomas More in the Broadway production of A Man for All Seasons. Four years later, he won the Academy Award for Best Actor when he reprised the role in the 1966 film adaptation, making him one of eleven to receive a Tony and Academy Award for the same role. His Emmy Award for Outstanding Lead Actor in a Miniseries or a Movie was achieved for the 1969 television film Male of the Species.

Preferring the stage to the screen and putting his family before his career, Scofield nonetheless established a reputation as one of the greatest Shakespearean performers. Among other accolades, his performance as Mark Van Doren in Quiz Show (1994) earned him an Academy Award nomination for Best Supporting Actor and he won Best Actor in a Supporting Role at the BAFTA Awards for portraying Thomas Danforth in The Crucible (1996). Scofield declined the honour of a knighthood, but was appointed CBE in 1956 and became a Companion of Honour in 2001.

Early life
Paul Scofield was born on 21 January 1922 in Edgbaston, Birmingham, Warwickshire, England, the son of Mary and Edward Harry Scofield. When Scofield was a few weeks old, his family moved to Hurstpierpoint, Sussex, where his father served as the headmaster at the Hurstpierpoint Church of England School. Scofield told his biographer, Garry O'Connor, that his upbringing was divided. His father was an Anglican and his mother a Roman Catholic. Baptised into his mother's faith, Scofield said, "some days we were little Protestants and, on others, we were all devout little Catholics." He added, "A lack of direction in spiritual matters is still with me."

Scofield recalls, "I was a dunce at school. But at the age of twelve I went to Varndean School at Brighton where I discovered Shakespeare. They did one of his plays every year, and I lived just for that."

In 1961, Scofield wrote, "I don't have a psychological approach to acting; fundamentally, I have an intuitive approach. For me, the totally intellectual approach is never satisfactory. What matters to me is whether I like the play, for one thing, and, for another, whether I can recognize and identify myself with the character I'm to play."

In 1939, Scofield left school at the age of seventeen and began training at the Croydon Repertory Theatre. Shortly after the outbreak of the Second World War, Scofield arrived for a physical examination and was ruled unfit for service in the British Army. He later recalled, "They found I had crossed toes. I was unable to wear boots. I was deeply ashamed."

Career
Scofield began his stage career in 1940 with a debut performance in American playwright Eugene O'Neill's Desire Under the Elms at the Westminster Theatre, and was soon being compared to Laurence Olivier. He played at the Birmingham Repertory Theatre.  From there he went to the Shakespeare Memorial Theatre in Stratford, where he starred in Walter Nugent Monck's 1947 revival of Pericles, Prince of Tyre.

In 1948, Scofield appeared as Hamlet at the Shakespeare Memorial Theatre in Stratford alongside a then unknown Claire Bloom as Ophelia. Scofield's performance was so highly praised that it caused him to be dubbed, "The Hamlet of his generation." He was also Bassanio in The Merchant of Venice with Bloom as an Attendee.

J.C. Trewin commented, "He is simply a timeless Hamlet... None could forget Scofield's pathos, the face folded in grief, at, 'When you are desirous to be blessed, I'll blessing beg of you.' We have known many correct, almost formal Hamlet's, aloof from Elsinore. Scofield was ever a prisoner within its bounds: the world had many confines, wards, and dungeons, Denmark being one of the worst."

John Harrison later recalled of Scofield's Hamlet, "'Get thee to a nunnery,' so often delivered with rage or scorn, he says so gently. You have visions of quiet and prayer. A future for Ophelia."

In her later book, Leaving a Doll's House: A Memoir, Claire Bloom recalls that during the production she had a very serious crush on Scofield. As Scofield, "was happily married and the father of a son", Bloom hoped only "to be flirted with and taken some notice of." But Scofield never so much as glanced at Bloom or any of the other pretty actresses in the cast.

Unusually, the production had two Hamlets: Scofield and Robert Helpmann took turns playing the title role and Bloom later recalled, "I could never make up my mind which of my two Hamlets I found the more devastating: the openly homosexual, charismatic Helpmann, or the charming, shy young man from Sussex."

Writing in 1961, Scofield explained, "Output in the theatre requires greater energy than anything else I know. Doubt of one's energy is the worst of all. One's output in the theatre requires energy of a sort that is never a factor in family life. Family energy generates itself. Social life outside the family can be exhausting. I don't care much for social life with people in the theatre. I'm rather good at being with people when I want to make the effort, but I'm bad at listening to people when I know what they're going to say. It isn't very interesting, and on the whole it's very draining. The interesting thing in the theatre is the work and working with people. I usually like the people in the work, but I can't go on with them outside the work as long as most actors can. And when I'm working on a part I'm thinking about it all the time, going over all the possibilities in my mind. I like to be alone when I'm working."

When asked about Bloom decades later, Scofield recalled, "Sixteen years old I think – so very young and necessarily inexperienced, she looked lovely, she acted with a daunting assurance which belied entirely her inexperience of almost timid reticence. She was a very good Ophelia."

Scofield's versatility at the height of his career is exemplified by his starring roles in theatrical productions as diverse as the musical Expresso Bongo (1958) and Peter Brook's celebrated production of King Lear (1962).

In his memoir Threads of Time, Peter Brook wrote about Scofield's versatility:
The door at the back of the set opened, and a small man entered. He was wearing a black suit, steel-rimmed glasses and holding a suitcase. For a moment we wondered who this stranger was and why he was wandering onto our stage. Then we realised that it was Paul, transformed. His tall body had shrunk; he had become insignificant. The new character now possessed him entirely.

In a career devoted chiefly to the classical theatre, Scofield starred in many Shakespeare plays and played the title role in Ben Jonson's Volpone in Peter Hall's production for the Royal National Theatre (1977).

In a 1994 interview, Scofield explained, "One of the great strengths of the theatre is that it is ephemeral. It does exist only in what you remember and you can't check up on it afterwards and think, 'That's not as good as I remember.' If any performance I've ever given stays in someone's mind that's so much more exciting than being able to put it on the video and play it again. It's not that I don't want to take risks - the opposite is true, in fact. But the more you know about acting, the more you're aware of the pitfalls and the more nerve-racking it becomes. When I was young, I wasn't nervous at all. Even doing Hamlet, I just had a go."

One of the highlights of Scofield's career in modern theatre is the role of Sir Thomas More in Robert Bolt's A Man for All Seasons, which opened in July 1960. Scofield later referred to the part as the only time, "my intuition for the part has failed me."

Theatre reviewers published very harsh criticism of Scofield's performance at first, which forced him to, "start from scratch and just work on facts, making myself totally faithful to what was on the page". After realizing, "I had to find the way the man would feel; then I was able to find the way he should sound", and the vital importance of conveying complete sincerity and humility when, "playing a man of spiritual depth", Scofield successfully developed a means of performing as Thomas More through trial and error.

Austrian-American filmmaker Fred Zinnemann later recalled of seeing the play onstage, "It dealt with the sixteenth-century English statesman Thomas More, beheaded on the orders of his King, Henry VIII, for refusing to sanction his marriage to Anne Boleyn. With Paul Scofield in the lead, the play was a powerful emotional experience. It dramatized the nation's unquestioning submission to the absolute power of the king, in stark contrast to More, whose last words before the execution were, 'I die the Kings good servant, but God's first.'"

When Fred Zinnemann was first approached about directing the 1966 film adaptation of A Man For All Seasons by Columbia Pictures executive Mike Frankovich in 1965 and enthusiastically agreed, the studio did not wish to cast Scofield as the lead. Preferring a more internationally bankable cast, the studio desired either Laurence Olivier or Richard Burton as Thomas More, Alec Guinness as Cardinal Wolsey, and Peter O'Toole as King Henry VIII. Both Zinnemann and screenwriter Robert Bolt disagreed, however, but still went through the motions of meeting with Olivier and then informing him politely that he had not been chosen.

Scofield, who was cast after Columbia grudgingly, "fell in with Zinnemann's wishes", later recalled, "I was surprised and honoured to be chosen for the film, being almost unknown in the movie world... My own task was unaltered except that I now focused on my thoughts on to a camera instead of an audience."

Even though defying the studio's casting wishes forced him to film A Man For All Seasons on a shoestring budget, Fred Zinnemann felt very differently about Scofield and later recalled of the film shoot, "For the first few days the crew did their usual work very well, the way they would have done any job, but on the third day, when Scofield made his speech about the majesty of the law, they were suddenly mesmerized by the magic of those words and they remained that way throughout the rest of the filming. So totally did Paul convey the scope of More's character that for months afterwards I couldn't help but look at him in awe, as a saint rather than an actor."

Scofield also appeared as Charles Dyer in Dyer's play Staircase, staged by the Royal Shakespeare Company in 1966; Laurie in John Osborne's A Hotel in Amsterdam (1968); and Antonio Salieri in the original stage production of Peter Shaffer's Amadeus (1979).

He was subsequently the voice of the Dragon in another play by Robert Bolt, a children's drama The Thwarting of Baron Bolligrew. Expresso Bongo, Staircase and Amadeus were filmed with other actors, but Scofield starred in the screen version of King Lear (1971).

Other major screen roles include the art-obsessed Wehrmacht Colonel von Waldheim in The Train (1964), Strether in a 1977 TV adaptation of Henry James's novel The Ambassadors, Tobias in Edward Albee's A Delicate Balance (1973), Professor Moroi in the film of János Nyíri's If Winter Comes (1980), for BBC Television; poet Mark Van Doren in Robert Redford's film Quiz Show (1994), and Deputy Governor Thomas Danforth in Nicholas Hytner's film adaptation (1996) of Arthur Miller's The Crucible.

Scofield was cast in the lead role of Sir Randolph Nettleby in the 1985 film The Shooting Party, but was forced to withdraw due to an injury he suffered on set. According to the DVD extras documentary for the film, Scofield and the other male lead actors were to come into shot on a horse-drawn shooting brake driven by the renowned film horse-master George Mossman as the first shot of the first day of filming. As they turned the first corner, the plank that Mossman was standing on broke in two and he was hurled forward and down, falling between the sets of wheels and taking the reins with him. He was struck by a horse's hoof and concussed. The horses shied and broke into a gallop.

Actor Rupert Frazer admitted that he was the first to jump off, landing safely, but bruised. Out of control, the horses turned to the right when confronted by a stone wall, causing the shooting brake to roll completely, catapulting the actors into a pile of scaffolding that had been stacked next to the wall. Robert Hardy stood up and realised to his amazement that he was unhurt. He looked across to see Edward Fox stand up, "turn completely green and collapse in a heap", having broken five ribs and his shoulder blade. He noticed that Scofield was lying very still on the ground "and I saw that his shin-bone was sticking out through his trousers". As the film takes place in October during the partridge-shooting season, the filmmakers had to make a choice whether to delay filming for a year or re-cast. The Shooting Party schedule was ultimately changed to allow James Mason to take over the part of Sir Randolph Nettleby six weeks later. Scofield's broken leg also deprived him of the part of O'Brien in Nineteen Eighty-Four, in which he was replaced by Richard Burton.

Helen Mirren, who appeared with Scofield in the 1989 film When the Whales Came, said, "He aspires to the soul rather than the character. He has no sense of personal ambition. He's one of our great, great actors. We're lucky to have him." Scofield also portrayed the Ghost in Franco Zeffirelli's 1990 film adaptation of Hamlet alongside Mel Gibson in the title role. Despite being an A-list actor at the time, Gibson, who had grown up idolising Scofield, compared the experience of performing Shakespeare alongside him to being, "thrown into the ring with Mike Tyson". Scofield, on the other hand, never felt similarly intimidated and later recalled about working with Gibson, "Not the actor you'd think would make an ideal Hamlet, but he had enormous integrity and intelligence."

Honours and awards
Scofield was appointed Commander of the Order of the British Empire (CBE) in the 1956 New Year Honours. 

When Scofield was nominated for the Academy Award for Best Actor for A Man for All Seasons, he declined to travel to Los Angeles to attend the ceremony. When Scofield won the award, his leading lady Wendy Hiller, whom Fred Zinnemann had cast as Lady Alice More for being, "particularly marvelous at doing a 'slow burn'", went up on stage to receive the Award Statue on Scofield's behalf. According to his biographer Garry O'Connor, Scofield always kept his Oscar Statue, "put... away in the corner of his workroom". Scofield explained, "Although it was nice to get, it's not decorative, really. I suppose that's why I don't display it. But if anyone wants to see it I'll get it out."

Scofield was subsequently nominated as Best Supporting Actor for Quiz Show. His many theatrical accolades include a 1962 Tony Award for A Man for All Seasons.

In 1969, Scofield became the sixth performer to win the Triple Crown of Acting, winning an Emmy Award for Outstanding Single Performance by an Actor in a Leading Role for Male of the Species.  He accomplished this in only seven years (1962–1969), which is still a record.

He was also one of only eleven actors to win both the Tony and the Oscar for the same role on stage and film, for A Man for All Seasons.

Scofield declined the honour of a knighthood on three occasions, but was appointed CBE in 1956 and became a Companion of Honour in 2001. In 2002 he was awarded the honorary degree of D. Litt by the University of Oxford.

When asked the reason for his decision to decline the knighthood, Scofield responded, "I have every respect for people who are offered [a knighthood] and accept it gratefully. It is just not an aspect of life that I would want." Gary O'Connor described being knighted as, "The kind of honour from which [Scofield] instinctively recoiled. Never the actor before the part he plays."

In 2004, a poll of actors of the Royal Shakespeare Company, including Ian McKellen, Donald Sinden, Janet Suzman, Ian Richardson, Antony Sher and Corin Redgrave, acclaimed Scofield's Lear as the greatest Shakespearean performance ever. Scofield appeared in many radio dramas for BBC Radio 4, including in later years plays by Peter Tinniswood: On the Train to Chemnitz (2001) and Anton in Eastbourne (2002). The latter was Tinniswood's last work and was written especially for Scofield, an admirer of Anton Chekhov. He was awarded the 2002 Sam Wanamaker Prize.

Personal life

Paul Scofield married actress Joy Mary Parker on 15 May 1943. They had met while he played Hamlet to her Ophelia. Scofield later said "Joy and I simply decided to be married. We were both of age and were determined. Any doubts from our families were overruled, and they were the usual ones – too young, etc. We had a week out at the end of The Moon Is Down tour, married during that week, and went straight into the Whitehall Theatre."

Paul and Joy Scofield had two children: Martin (born 1945) who became a senior lecturer in English and American literature at the University of Kent and Sarah (born 1951). When asked by Garry O'Connor how he wished to be remembered, Scofield responded "If you have a family, that is how to be remembered." When O'Connor asked about his seventieth birthday, Scofield replied, "Birthdays are a bore, really. It's true, I do like my fallow times... I hate missing anything that might be happening outside on a summer evening, something in the garden." Filmmaker Michael Winner accordingly described Paul and Joy Scofield as "one of the few very happily married couples I've ever met."

Death
Scofield died from leukaemia on 19 March 2008 at the age of 86 at the Royal Sussex County Hospital in Brighton, East Sussex, England. His memorial service was held at Westminster Abbey on the first anniversary of his death. His wife Joy died four years later on 7 November 2012, aged 90.

Filmography
{| class="wikitable sortable"
|-
! Year
! Title
! Role
! class="unsortable"| Notes
|-
| 1955
| That Lady
| King Philip II of Spain
| BAFTA Award for Best Newcomer
|-
| 1958
| Carve Her Name with Pride
| Tony Fraser
|
|-
| 1964
| 
| Col. von Waldheim
|
|-
| 1966
| 
| Sir Thomas More
| 
|-
| 1968
| Tell Me Lies
|
|
|-
|1969
| The Red Tent
| The Main Judge (uncredited)
|
|-
| rowspan="2"|1970
| Bartleby| The Accountant
|
|-
| Nijinsky: Unfinished Project| Sergei Diaghilev
|
|-
| 1971
| King Lear| King Lear
| Bodil Award for Best Actor
|-
| rowspan="2"|1973
| Scorpio| Zharkov
|
|-
| | Tobias
|
|-
| 1983
| Ill Fares the Land| 
| Voice
|-
| 1984
| Summer Lightning| Old Robert Clarke
|
|-
| rowspan="1"|1985
| 1919| Alexander Scherbatov
|
|-
| rowspan="2"|1989
| When the Whales Came| Zachariah "The Birdman" Woodcock
|
|-
| Henry V| Charles VI of France
|
|-
| 1990
| Hamlet| The Ghost
|
|-
| rowspan="2"|1992
| Utz| Doctor Vaclav Orlik
|
|-
| London| Narrator
|
|-
| rowspan="1"|1994
| Quiz Show| Mark Van Doren
| 
|-
| 1996
| | Judge Thomas Danforth
| 
|-
| 1997
| Robinson in Space| Narrator
|
|-
| rowspan="2"|1999
| Animal Farm| Boxer
| Voice
|-
| Rashi: A Light After the Dark Ages| 
| Voice
|}
(For a slightly different, more exhaustive list, see this note.)

Television

(for a different and more exhaustive list, see this note.)

Discography
Paul Scofield led the cast in several dramas issued by Caedmon Records:King Lear, directed by Howard Sackler (Text edited by G.B. Harrison), with Pamela Brown (Goneril), Rachel Roberts (Regan), Ann Bell (Cordelia); Wallace Eaton (France), John Rogers (Burgundy), Trevor Martin (Cornwall), Michael Aldridge (Albany), Andrew Keir (Kent), Cyril Cusack (Gloucester), Robert Stephens (Edgar), John Stride (Edmund), Ronnie Stevens (Fool); Arthur Hewlett (Curan, Doctor), Ronald Ibbs (Gentleman, Knight), Willoughby Goddard (Oswald). Eight sides, SRS 233 (first published 1965).Hamlet, directed by Howard Sackler, (Unabridged), with Diana Wynyard (Queen), Roland Culver (Claudius), Donald Houston (Laertes), Zena Walker (Ophelia), Wilfrid Lawson. Eight sides, SRS 232 (first published 1963).A Midsummer Night's Dream, directed by Howard Sackler, with Barbara Jefford, Joy Parker, John Stride, etc. Six sides, SRS 208 (first published 1964).
T.S. Eliot, The Family Reunion, with Flora Robson, Sybil Thorndike, Alan Webb. Six sides, TRS 308.
Charles Dickens, A Christmas Carol, with Ralph Richardson as Scooge. Scofield only narrated. (Caedmon),

Also:Homage to T.S. Eliot, with Laurence Olivier, John Le Mesurier, Cleo Laine, Bernard Cribbins, George Devine, Groucho Marx, Alec McGowen, Anna Quayle, Clive Revill, Ian Richardson, and Nicol Williamson (1965)King Lear, with Harriet Walter (Goneril), Sara Kestelman (Regan), Emilia Fox (Cordelia), Alec McCowen (Gloucester), Kenneth Branagh (Fool), David Burke, Richard A. McCabe, Toby Stephens, etc. Released 2002 to coincide with Scofield's 80th birthday. (Naxos Audiobooks, 3-CD set).
Virgil, The Aeneid, Paul Scofield (narrator), Jill Balcon and Toby Stephens (readers). (Naxos Audiobook CD).
T.S. Eliot, The Waste Land and Four Quartets (BBC Radiobooks CD).
Sandor Marai, Embers (Penguin Audiobooks) – Narrator
With David Suchet and Ron Moody, Scofield led the cast of a radio dramatization of the Narnia books by C.S. Lewis, which are available as CD issues. (Tynedale Entertainment) – Narrator
Scofield recorded abridged readings of Dickens's A Christmas Carol and Bleak House (Blackstone Audiobooks).Façade (Sitwell-Walton), performed by Paul Scofield and Peggy Ashcroft, with London Sinfonietta conducted by William Walton. (Argo Records, 1972)Don Quixote: The Musical, with Roy Hudd as Sancho Panza. Based on Purcell and D'Urfey's The Comical History of Don Quixote''. Later released on CD.(Musica Oscura, 1994)
(For a more exhaustive list, see this note:)

References

External links

BBC News Interview-Paul Scofield, A Man For All Seasons
Obituaries:
The Guardian, 20 March 2008
The Independent, 21 March 2008
The Times, 21 March 2008
The Daily Telegraph, 22 March 2008

1922 births
2008 deaths
20th-century English male actors
21st-century English male actors
Audiobook narrators
BAFTA Most Promising Newcomer to Leading Film Roles winners
Best Actor Academy Award winners
Best British Actor BAFTA Award winners
Best Supporting Actor BAFTA Award winners
Best Drama Actor Golden Globe (film) winners
Best Actor Bodil Award winners
Deaths from cancer in England
Commanders of the Order of the British Empire
Deaths from leukemia
English male film actors
English male radio actors
English male Shakespearean actors
English male stage actors
English male television actors
English male voice actors
Members of the Order of the Companions of Honour
Outstanding Performance by a Lead Actor in a Miniseries or Movie Primetime Emmy Award winners
People from Balcombe, West Sussex
People from Hurstpierpoint
Royal Shakespeare Company members
Tony Award winners